Garlic chive flower sauce (Chinese: 韭花酱) is a condiment made by fermenting flowers of the Allium tuberosum. The condiment is used in Chinese cuisine (especially Northwest Chinese cuisine) as a dip for its fragrant, savory, and salty attributes. Historically, both Chinese and Europeans have savored this flower for its aroma and mild garlic flavor.

History 
The condiment originated in China, where the plant was first cultivated for culinary purposes in the Zhou Dynasty. The usage of garlic chives' flowers in a dipping sauce for mutton dates from the 8th or 9th century CE. In the Jiu Hua Tie, the fifth most important piece of Chinese calligraphy in semi-cursive script,  (873-954) recorded using garlic chive flowers to enhance the flavors of mutton:  At the start of autumn, the chive flowers begin to become flavorful and can be used to enhance lamb flavors. This is a true delicacy that, apart from satiating hunger, gave a memorable experience. A similar usage is described in written records from the later Qing Period.

The contemporary Chinese writer Wang Zengqi has described and commented on the custom of making garlic chive flower sauce in northern Chinese households, asserting that it originated in Northwest China. He has analyzed the Jiu Hua Tie from the perspective of a fellow writer and epicure; discussing the usage of the flower, he wrote:

Preparation 

The condiment is made by fermenting grounded flowers of garlic chives in salt, sesame oil, and spices including Sichuan pepper, ginger, and garlic. After it is made, it can be stored for up to a year. Different regions may vary in preference on production methods and the inclusion or exclusion of certain spices, but pickling a combination of predominant chive flowers and supplementary spices is common.

Culinary uses 
The condiment can be used as a dipping sauce for boiled mutton and can also be a composite material for the dipping sauce of Chinese hot pot. It is used in small quantities and usually mixed with sesame paste or rice vinegar (among others) to avoid an overwhelmingly salty taste.

References 

Chinese sauces